MOQ, Moq, Moq., moq, or MoQ may refer to:

 Pirsig's metaphysics of quality (MOQ) – a theory of reality
 Alfred Moquin-Tandon – a botanist whose author abbreviation is Moq.
 Morondava Airport – a Madagascan airport with the IATA code MOQ
 Mor language (Papuan) – a human language with the language code moq
 Moq (software) – a .NET Framework library for creating mock objects
 Moquegua Region – a region in Peru with ISO 3166 code PE-MOQ
 Minimum order quantity (MOQ) – a term used in trade to determine a product's minimum number of pieces to place an order.
 MoQ - A mobile payment platform in Lithuania developed by the three mobile network operators: Bitė Lietuva, Tele2 and Telia Lietuva.